Phytosteroids, also known as plant steroids, are naturally occurring steroids that are found in plants. Examples include digoxin, digitoxin, diosgenin, and guggulsterone, as well as phytosterols like β-sitosterol and other phytoestrogens like isoflavones.

References

Steroids